Jobe Wheelhouse (born 14 April 1985 in Newcastle, New South Wales, Australia) is an Australian football (soccer) player who plays for Lambton Jaffas.

Club career
Wheelhouse was unavailable for the majority of the 2006-07 A-League season and made his return against Perth Glory in Round 1 of the 2007–08 season.

Since returning, the often unfairly maligned Wheelhouse has impressed for the Jets, one of the standouts in Newcastle's disastrous 2008-09 A-League campaign, where they plummeted from champions to wooden spooners in one season. Jobe scored one of the great A-League goals of all time in a Round 18 clash with Gold Coast United in season 2009–10. The goal was described by Gold Coast manager Miron Bleiberg as a "Maradona-style" goal.

On 23 September 2011 he was appointed captain of the Newcastle Jets for the 2011–12 A-League season.
After playing quite an important role in his captaincy, Jobe Wheelhouse was again appointed the captain of the Newcastle United Jets for the 2012/ 2013 Hyundai A-League Season.

On 31 January 2013 it was announced that Wheelhouse had quit the club and was taking the rest of the season off. The reason behind his departure was that his contract was not going to be renewed for the 2013/2014 season. He then moved on to playing for Northern NSW State League side Lambton Jaffas.

In 2020, Wheelhouse made an appearance for the Northern NSW State League Division 1 side Toronto Awaba Stags

International career

Youth
He represented Australia at the 2003 FIFA World Youth Championship.

Honours
With Newcastle Jets:
 Australia A-League Championship: 2007-2008

References

External links
 Newcastle Jets profile
 Oz Football profile

1985 births
Living people
Australian soccer players
A-League Men players
National Soccer League (Australia) players
Newcastle Jets FC players
Sportspeople from Newcastle, New South Wales
National Premier Leagues players
Association football midfielders